Dehio is a surname. Notable people with the surname include:

 Erhard Arnold Julius Dehio (1855–1940), Baltic German merchant and politician, former mayor of Tallinn (1918)
 Georg Dehio (1850–1932), Baltic German art historian
 Ludwig Dehio (1888–1963), German archivist and historian, son of Georg Dehio
 Karl Gottfried Konstantin Dehio (1851–1927), Baltic German internist and professor of pathology

See also 
 48415 Dehio, a main-belt asteroid named after Georg Dehio